Datuk Haji Aliasgar Bin Haji Basri (Jawi: علي أصغر بسري; born 25 February 1960) is a Malaysian politician currently living in Tuaran Sabah Malaysia. Aliasgar is an alumnus of Southern Illinois University.

Personal life 
Aliasgar was born in the town of Tuaran of Sabah. He is married to Datin Hajjah Jumiah bt Ele and has a son and four daughters.

Besides contributing in politics, Aliasgar was also a radio presenter for  Radio Televisyen Malaysia (RTM).

Educational background 
Aliasgar started his education in Serusup Primary School of Tuaran in 1965. He continued his study at SMK Tuaran in 1971, and St John Secondary School, Tuaran in 1972 until 1976.

In 1982, he continued his studies in Bachelor of Science Management at the College of Business and Administration of the Southern Illinois University and got his bachelor's degree on 15 May 1985.

In 1999, he continued his studies at the University Malaysia Sabah and completed his Master of Business Administration course on 12 September 2004. He is among the first batch of 34 graduates to receive Master of Business Administration degrees from University Malaysia Sabah.

Early politics

PEMAU
Aliasgar has been politically active since college, where he joined various student affairs organisations notably the North American Student Association or Persatuan Mahasiswa Amerika Utara (PEMAU) which covers both America and Canada. Aliasgar was the President of PEMAU in 1985.

UMNO Club
Aliasgar was also among the founders of the first ever UMNO Club of the Malaysian political party UMNO in the USA. He was an exco for the Carbondale UMNO Club in the US from 1983 to 1986, during his studies at Southern Illinois University.

Sabah, Malaysia 16th State Election 2020, WARISAN

In the snap 2020 Sabah state election, at the age of 60 years, Aliasgar Basri was fielded by his party, Sabah Heritage Party or WARISAN to face a 3 cornered fight in the N12 – Sulaman state seat under the P170 Tuaran parliamentary seat, but lost.

Aliasgar fought a three cornered fight between incumbent Assemblyman for Sulaman Hajiji Noor leader of the PN (BERSATU) and later became the Chief Minister and Rekan Stan from Love Sabah Party (PCS) in the recent state election.

Malaysia 8th General Election 1990, BERJAYA

In the 1990 election, at a young age of 29 years old, Aliasgar was fielded by his party, Sabah People's United Front or BERJAYA to face a 7 cornered fight in the N11 – Sulaman state seat under the P137 Tuaran parliamentary seat, but lost.

Politic Career, UMNO Politics

1991 UMNO Tuaran Division Pro tem Committee member
Aliasgar became one of the 20 Pro tem committee members (Malay:AJK Penaja) of the newly formed UMNO Sabah in 1991. He was also the UMNO Tuaran Division committee member (Malay: AJK Bahagian) and appointed as the UMNO Tuaran Division Youth Secretary (Malay:Setiausaha Pemuda Bahagian).

1994 Deputy Director General of UPKR
In 1994, Aliasgar was appointed as the Deputy Director General of the People's Development Leaders’ Unit (Malay: Unit Pemimpin Kemajuan Rakyat, UPKR) under the Chief Minister's Department of Sabah.

1996 UPKR's Director General
In 1996, Aliasgar was appointed as the Director General of the People's Development Leaders’ Unit (Malay: Unit Pemimpin Kemajuan Rakyat, UPKR) under the Chief Minister's Department of Sabah.

1998 UMNO Tuaran Division Youth Chief
In 1998 party elections, Aliasgar contested for the UMNO Tuaran Division Youth Chief post (Malay: Ketua Pemuda Umno Tuaran) and won. He held the post until 2001.

1999 UMNO Sabah State Youth Information Chief
Due to a major shuffle in the UMNO Malaysia Youth Movement in 1999, Aliasgar was appointed as the UMNO Sabah State Youth Information Chief (Malay :Ketua Penerangan Pemuda UMNO Sabah).

2000 Malaysia Youth Executive Council
In 2000, Aliasgar was appointed as committee member of the Malaysia Youth Executive Council (MBM).

2001 UMNO Tuaran Division Vice Chief
In the 2001 party elections, Aliasgar contested for the UMNO Tuaran Division Vice Chief (Malay: Naib Ketua Bahagian Tuaran), but lost.

2004 UMNO Tuaran Division Deputy Chief
In the 2004 party elections, Aliasgar contested for the UMNO Tuaran Division Deputy Chief (Malay:Timbalan Ketua Bahagian) and won. He defeated former Divisional UMNO Chief af Tuaran, Datuk Yusof Manan.

2007 UMNO Tuaran Division Deputy Chief
In the 2007 party elections, Aliasgar contested for the UMNO Tuaran Division Deputy Chief (Malay:Timbalan Ketua Bahagian) and won. He defeated  Dato' Rahman Dahlan for the post.

2007 UMNO Sabah Training Bureau Secretary
In 2007, Aliasgar was appointed as the Secretary of Sabah UMNO Training Bureau (Malay: Setiausaha Biro Latihan UMNO Sabah).

2007 UMNO Malaysia Training Bureau committee member
In 2007, Aliasgar was appointed as the UMNO Malaysia Training Bureau committee member (Malay: Ahli Jawatankuasa Biro Latihan UMNO Malaysia). During this time, he was involved in conducting more than hundred training courses around Malaysia.

2010 UMNO Tuaran Division Deputy Chief
In the 2010 party elections, Aliasgar contested to defend his post the UMNO Tuaran Division Deputy Chief (Malay: Timbalan Ketua Bahagian Tuaran). Aliasgar defeated Dato' Rahman Dahlan for the post.

2013 UMNO Tuaran Division Deputy Chief
However, in the 2013 party elections, Aliasgar decided not to defend his post and subsequently 'gave way' to Dato' Rahman Dahlan to win the post unopposed.

Politic Career, WARISAN Politics

2020 WARISAN Sulaman Election Candidate
In the 2020 Sabah state election, Aliasgar Basri was fielded by his party, Sabah Heritage Party or WARISAN in the N12 – Sulaman state seat under the P170 Tuaran parliamentary seat.

2022 WARISAN Tuaran Division Chief
In the 2022 party elections, Aliasgar contested for the WARISAN Tuaran Division Chief (Malay:Ketua Bahagian) and won. He defeated defending Chief, Rakam Sijim for the post and won with more than half majority.

2023 WARISAN Malaysia Executive Secretary
In 2023, Aliasgar was appointed as the Warisan Malaysia Executive Secretary (Malay: Setiausaha Kerja Pusat).

NGO

Islamic Leadership Development Program

Aliasgar is one of the 13 Fellows from The Philippines, Malaysia and Indonesia  of the Islamic Leadership Fellows Program, organised by Asian Institute of Management, Manila (AIM), with the collaboration of British Embassy in the Philippines. He was nominated by the his alma mater Universiti Malaysia Sabah to participate in the program.

Majlis Belia Malaysia (MBM)

Aliasgar is an active member of the Malaysia Youth Council (Majlis Belia Malaysia) in the 1990s during his early days while active in national politics. He is now an alumnus of the Alumni Majlis Belia Malaysia (Sabah) and currently holding the position of Vice President II for his alma mater.

United Sabah BUMIS Organization (USBO) 

Aliasgar is an active member of the United Sabah BUMIS Organization (USBO) an organisation for the Bajau and other indigenous ethnic groups in Sabah. He is currently holding the position of Deputy President II for USBO. TS DSP Pandikar Amin Mulia delivered the letter of appointment to Aliasgar on 20Apr 2017.

Radio Sabah Alumni Association (RASA)

Aliasgar is an active member of the Radio Sabah Alumni Association (RASA) the alumnus group for Radio Televisyen Malaysia ex personnels. He is currently holding the position of Vice President for RASA.

UMS Alumni Association

Aliasgar is an active member of the UMS Alumni Association or Pertubuhan Alumni UMS and was holding the position of Deputy President for his alma mater, University Malaysia Sabah.

Honours and awards

  :
  Member of the Order of Kinabalu (ADK) (1994)
  Companion of the Order of Kinabalu (ASDK) (2000)
  Commander of the Order of Kinabalu (PGDK) – Datuk (2010)
  :
  Member of the Order of Melaka (DSM) (2005)

Election results

References

External links 
 

1960 births
Malaysian politicians
Southern Illinois University alumni
Living people
Commanders of the Order of Kinabalu